Ikebdanen or Kebdana (Berber: Ikebdanen or Icebdanen) is a Riffian Zenata Berber tribe that lives in the Rif mountainous region of northern Morocco, at east of the city of Nador and at west of the city of Berkane.  

Berbers in Morocco
Ethnic groups in Morocco
Indigenous peoples of North Africa
Riffian people